Hajdini is an Albanian surname. Notable people with the surname include:

Bledar Hajdini (born 1995), Albanian footballer from Kosovo
Hafize Hajdini (born 1972), Albanian deputy from Kosovo
Zenel Hajdini (1910–1942), Albanian partisan

Albanian-language surnames